Denai Alam is a affluent township located approximately 10 km north of the Shah Alam city centre alongside the Guthrie Corridor Expressway and is a part of Mukim Bukit Raja in Petaling District.

The township was developed by Sime Darby Property, the property development arm of the Malaysian conglomerate, Sime Darby Berhad. The  township is planned based on the “Denai” concept which is 4.8 km of landscaped footpaths for pedestrians and non-motorised vehicles. The Denai concept was inspired by traditional Malay kampong communal living and a low-density development of 8 units per acre. The Denai Alam development was awarded the 2003 Planning Innovation Award by the Malaysian Institute of Planners.

Denai Alam is located adjacent to The master plan of the city of Elmina also developed by sime  Darby properties.

To date (June 2022),Denai alam has grown to be a really green and beautiful township with hipster cafés and other facilities. The population Denai Alam is expected to grow  even more.

Access
Denai Alam can be accessed from major population centres in Klang Valley either through the Guthrie Corridor Expressway which in turn is connected to the New Klang Valley Expressway, or the NKVE   and the North–South Expressway Central Link, NSECL , also known as the ELITE Highway or via State Road B9, more popularly known as Jalan Sungai Buloh.

Public transportation
Currently there is no public transportation service to this township, however, RapidKL buses do ply the Bukit Subang – Subang Airport (T772) route.

Public amenities
Based on the development plan, a mosque, a police station, a fire station, two community halls, primary and secondary schools will be built.

External links

 Sime Darby Property – Denai Alam
 Sime Darby Berhad Annual Report 2005
 Rapidkl Area 6 - Shah Alam Utara, Subang, Damansara, PJ Utara, Bangsar
 Denai Alam Residents Association Forum

Petaling District
Townships in Selangor